Voice TV is a Thai television channel, notable for its liberal and pro-Thaksin stance and political-centric analysis. It is broadcast via digital terrestrial television (from 2014 until 2019), satellite, cable (as Video To Home 2), and web streaming. It was founded and currently owned by former Prime Minister Thaksin Shinawatra's son, Panthongtae ("Oak"), through Voice TV Co., Ltd. (formerly How Come Entertainment Co., Ltd.).

Programming

News and analysis 
 Wake Up Thailand
 Talking Thailand
 Overview
 The Daily Dose : World of Politics

Anchors and analysts

Current
 Weeranun Kunha
 Patshaya Mahatanodhamma
 Nattakorn Devakula

Former
 Passavee Thitiphonwattanakul (now at TNN16)
 Sasiphong Chartphot (now at Channel 8)

Notes

24-hour television news channels in Thailand
Television stations in Thailand
Liberalism in Thailand